Mankayan, officially the Municipality of Mankayan, is a 1st class municipality in the province of Benguet, Philippines. According to the 2020 census, it has a population of 37,233 people.

The municipality is known as a mining town, being the location of several mines, including the Lepanto Consolidated Mining Company.

Etymology
The name "Mankayan" is derived from Nancayan, the Hispanic term of the native name of the place, Nangkayang (which means "high up in the mountain").

History

Pre-colonial period
Nangkayang was once a heavily forested area. The natives of the surrounding settlements of Panat and Bag-ongan mined gold through the labon system, after its reported discovery in a river. Copper was later discovered by the end of the 16th century in Kamangga-an (location of present-day Lepanto).

Spanish period
By the 1800s, the Spanish colonial government sent expeditions to survey the mines. On February 3, 1850, an expedition led by engineer Don Antonio Hernandez confirmed the presence of copper in Mankayan.

In 1852, Lepanto was established by the Spanish as a comandancia politico-militar, composed of several rancherias which included Mankayan.

Seven different mines were discovered in the Mankayan-Suyoc region during Admiral Pedro Durán de Monforte's 1667 expedition, and Simón de Anda's administration (1770-1776) mentioned Igorot copperware.  In 1833, Galvey sent ore samples from Gambang ("copper"), Suyoc, and Mankayan, to the governor.  The first Spanish mining claim on the Cordillera was made by Tomás Balbas y Castro on 26 March 1856, and established a mining company called the Sociedad Minero-Metalurgica Cantabro Filipino de Mancayan. The company ceased operations in 1875.

American period
Under the American rule, Mankayan remained under the jurisdiction of Lepanto, and later Lepanto-Bontoc until the latter's dissolution. Mankayan was later annexed to the sub-province of Benguet as a municipal district in 1913.

The mining boom in Mankayan began in 1933, with American Victor Lednickey establishing the Lepanto Consolidated Mining Company on September 26, 1936.

Second World War
In 1942, following the outbreak of the war, the Lepanto Consolidated Mining Company, together with the Suyoc Consolidated Mining Company, were taken over by the Japanese Mitsui Mining Company, which renamed the mines into "Mitsui Mankayan Copper Mines". The Mitsui Company controlled the mines until 1945.

Post-war era
After the war, the Lepanto Consolidated Mining Company resumed the mining operations.

Mankayan was converted from a municipal district into a regular municipality on June 16, 1955, by virtue of Republic Act 1302.

In 2018, in order to preserve the highly artistic gangsa-making intangible heritage of the Mankayan elders, the cultural masters of the town converged and began teaching the younger generations the process and importance of gangsa-making to their way of life, effectively preserving indigenous gong culture in the town.

Geography
Mankayan is on the north-western tip of Benguet. It is bordered by Bakun on the west, Buguias on the southeast, Tadian and Bauko on the east, and Cervantes on the north-west.

According to the Philippine Statistics Authority, the municipality has a land area of  constituting  of the  total area of Benguet.

Barangays
Mankayan is politically subdivided into 12 barangays. These barangays are headed by elected officials: Barangay Captain, Barangay Council, whose members are called Barangay Councilors. All are elected every three years.

Climate

Demographics

In the 2020 census, Mankayan had a population of 37,233.

Economy

Government
Mankayan, belonging to the lone congressional district of the province of Benguet, is governed by a mayor designated as its local chief executive and by a municipal council as its legislative body in accordance with the Local Government Code. The mayor, vice mayor, and the councilors are elected directly by the people through an election which is being held every three years.

Elected officials

Education

Public schools
As of 2014, Mankayan has 35 public elementary schools and 9 public secondary schools.

Notes

References

External links
 [ Philippine Standard Geographic Code]

Municipalities of Benguet
Populated places on the Abra River
Mining communities in the Philippines